The airports whose ICAO codes start with 'F' are in Central Africa, Southern Africa, and the Indian Ocean.

Format of entries is:
 ICAO (IATA) – Airport Name – Airport Location

FA – South Africa 

 FAAB (ALJ) – Kortdoorn Airport – Alexander Bay
 FAAG (AGZ) – Aggeneys Airport – Aggeneys
 FAAN – Aliwal North Airport – Aliwal North
 FABE (BIY) – Bhisho Airport – Bhisho
 FABL (BFN) – Bloemfontein Airport – Bloemfontein
 FABM (BHM) – Bethlehem Airfield – Bethlehem
 FABU (UTE) – Bultfontein Airport – Bultfontein
 FACD (CDO) – Cradock Airport – Cradock
 FACN – Carnarvon Airport – Carnarvon
 FACT (CPT) – Cape Town International Airport – Cape Town
 FADN – AFB Durban – Durban
 FAEL (ELS) – East London Airport – East London
 FAEM (EMG) – Empangeni Airport – Empangeni
 FAER (ELL) – Ellisras (Mitimba) Airport – Ellisras
 FAFB (FCB) – Ficksburg Airport – Ficksburg
 FAFK – Fisantekraal Airfield – Fisantekraal, near Durbanville 
 FAGC (GCJ) – Grand Central Airport – Johannesburg
 FAGG (GRJ) – George Airport – George
 FAGI (GIY) – Giyani Airport – Giyani
 FAGM (QRA) – Rand Airport – Johannesburg
 FAHL (HLW) – Hluhluwe Airport – Hluhluwe
 FAHR (HRS) – Harrismith Airport – Harrismith
 FAHS (HDS) – AFB Hoedspruit – Hoedspruit
 FAJS (JNB) – Old code for OR Tambo International Airport – Johannesburg (previously known as Jan Smuts International Airport). Since 26 July 2012 it has been designated FAOR
 FAKD (KXE) – Klerksdorp Airport – Klerksdorp
 FAKF – Kersefontein Farm – Hopefield
 FAKG – Kwandwe Private Game Reserve  – Fort Brown Eastern Cape (Identifier was formerly Komati Power Station)
 FAKM (KIM) – Kimberley Airport – Kimberley
 FAKN (MQP) – Kruger Mpumalanga International Airport – Nelspruit (Kruger National Park)
 FAKO – Komga – Komga
 FAKP (KOF) – Komatipoort Airport – Komatipoort
 FAKR – Krugersdorp Airport – Krugersdorp
 FAKS – Kroonstad Airport – Kroonstad
 FAKU (KMH) – Johan Pienaar Airport – Kuruman
 FAKZ (KLZ) – Kleinsee Airport – Kleinsee
 FALA (HLA) – Lanseria Airport – Lanseria
 FALC (LMR) – Finsch Mine Airport – Lime Acres
 FALE (DUR) – King Shaka International Airport – Durban
 FALK – Lusikisiki Airport – Lusikisiki

 FALM (LCD) – AFB Makhado, SAAF – Makhado
 FALW (SDB) – AFB Langebaanweg SAAF – Langebaan

 FALY (LAY) – Ladysmith Airport – Ladysmith
 FAMD (AAM) – Malamala Airport – Malamala
 FAMG (MGH) – Margate Airport – Margate
 FAMM (MBD) – Mmabatho International Airport – Mmabatho
 FAMN (LLE) – Malelane Airport – Malelane
 FAMO (MZY) – Mossel Bay Airport – Mossel Bay
 FAMS (MEZ) – Messina Airport – Messina
 FAMU (MZQ) – Mkuze Airport – Mkuze
 FAMW (MZF) – Mzamba (Wild Coast) Airport – Mzamba
 FANC (NCS) – Newcastle Airport – Newcastle
 FANG (NGL) – Ngala Airfield – Ngala
 FANS (NLP) – Nelspruit Airport – Nelspruit
 FAOI – Orient Airfield – Magaliesburg
 FAOH (OUH) – Oudtshoorn Airport – Oudtshoorn
 FAOR (JNB) – O. R. Tambo International Airport – Before 26 July 2012 this airport was known as Jan Smuts International Airport (FAJS).
 FAPA (AFD) – Port Alfred Airport – Port Alfred
 FAPE (PLZ) – Port Elizabeth Airport – Port Elizabeth
 FAPG (PBZ) – Plettenberg Bay Airport – Plettenberg Bay
 FAPH (PHW) – Hendrik Van Eck Airport – Phalaborwa
 FAPI – Pietersburg Civil Aerodrome  – Polokwane
 FAPJ (JOH) – Port St. Johns Airport – Port St. Johns
 FAPK (PRK) – Prieska Airport – Prieska
 FAPM (PZB) – Pietermaritzburg Airport – Pietermaritzburg
 FAPN (NTY) – Pilanesberg International Airport – Pilanesberg (near Sun City)
 FAPP (PTG) – Polokwane International Airport – Polokwane (formerly FAPB)
 FAPS (PCF) – Potchefstroom Airport – Potchefstroom
 FAQT (UTW) – Queenstown Airport – Queenstown
 FARB (RCB) – Richards Bay Airport – Richards Bay
 FARG – Rustenburg Airfield – Rustenburg
 FARS (ROD) – Robertson Airport – Robertson
 FASB (SBU) – Springbok Airport – Springbok
 FASC (ZEC) – Secunda Airport – Secunda
 FASD – Vredenburg Airport – Saldanha Bay
 FASE (GSS) – Sabi Sabi Airport – Sabi Sabi
 FASH – Stellenbosch Flying Club – Stellenbosch
 FASK – AFB Swartkop – Centurion
 FASS (SIS) – Sishen Airport – Dingleton
 FASZ (SZK) – Skukuza Airport – Skukuza
 FATA – Teddarfield Airpark
 FATH (THY) – P.R. Mphephu Airport – Thohoyandou
 FATN (TCU) – Thaba Nchu Airport – Thaba Nchu
 FATP – New Tempe – Bloemfontein
 FATZ (LTA) – Tzaneen Airport – Tzaneen
 FAUL (ULD) – Ulundi Airport – Ulundi
 FAUP (UTN) – Upington Airport – Upington
 FAUT (UTT) – Mthatha Airport – Mthatha
 FAVB (VRU) – Vryburg Airport – Vryburg
 FAVG (VIR) – Virginia Airport – Durban
 FAVR (VRE) – Vredendal Airport – Vredendal
 FAVW – Victoria West Airport - Victoria West
 FAVY (VYD) – Vryheid Airport – Vryheid
 FAWB (PRY) – Wonderboom Airport – Pretoria
 FAWC       – Worcester Airport – Worcester
 FAWK (WKF) – AFB Waterkloof, SAAF – Tshwane
 FAWM (WEL) – Welkom Airport – Welkom
 FAYP – Ysterplaat AFB – Cape Town

FB – Botswana 

 FBFT (FRW) – Francistown Airport – Francistown
 FBGM – Gumare Airport – Gumare
 FBGZ (GNZ) – Ghanzi Airport – Ghanzi
 FBJW (JWA) – Jwaneng Airport – Jwaneng
 FBKE (BBK) – Kasane Airport – Kasane
 FBKG – Kang Airport – Kang
 FBKR (KHW) – Khwai River Airport – Khwai River
 FBKY – Kanye Airport – Kanye
 FBLO (LOQ) – Lobatse Airport – Lobatse
 FBMM – Makalamabedi Airport – Makalamabedi
 FBMN (MUB) – Maun Airport – Maun
 FBNN – Nokaneng Airport – Nokaneng
 FBNT – Nata Airport – Nata
 FBOR (ORP) – Orapa Airport – Orapa
 FBPY (QPH) – Palapye Airport – Palapye
 FBRK – Rakops Airport – Rakops
 FBSK (GBE) – Sir Seretse Khama International Airport – Gaborone
 FBSN (SXN) – Sua Pan Airport – Sua Pan
 FBSP (PKW) – Selebi-Phikwe Airport – Selebi-Phikwe
 FBSR – Serowe Airport – Serowe
 FBSV (SVT) – Savuti Airport – Savuti
 FBSW (SWX) – Shakawe Airport – Shakawe
 FBTE – Tshane Airport – Tshane
 FBTL (TLD) – Tuli Lodge Airport – Tuli Lodge
 FBTS (TBY) – Tshabong Airport – Tshabong
 FBXG – Xugana Airport – Xugana

FC – Republic of the Congo 

 FCBB (BZV) – Maya-Maya Airport – Brazzaville
 FCBD (DJM) – Djambala Airport – Djambala
 FCBK (KNJ) – Kindamba Airport – Kindamba
 FCBL (LCO) – Lague Airport – Lague
 FCBM (MUY) – Mouyondzi Airport – Mouyondzi
 FCBS (SIB) – Sibiti Airport – Sibiti
 FCBY (NKY) – Yokangassi Airport – Nkayi
 FCBZ (ANJ) – Zanaga Airport – Zanaga
 FCMM (MSX) – Mossendjo Airport – Mossendjo
 FCOB (BOE) – Boundji Airport – Boundji
 FCOE (EWO) – Ewo Airport – Ewo
 FCOG (GMM) – Gamboma Airport – Gamboma
 FCOI (ION) – Impfondo Airport – Impfondo
 FCOK (KEE) – Kelle Airport – Kelle
 FCOM (MKJ) – Makoua Airport – Makoua
 FCOO (FTX) – Owando Airport – Owando
 FCOS (SOE) – Souanke Airport – Souanke
 FCOT (BTB) – Betou Airport – Betou
 FCOU (OUE) – Ouesso Airport – Ouesso
 FCPA (KMK) – Makabana Airport – Makabana
 FCPL (DIS) – Dolisie Airport – Dolisie
 FCPP (PNR) – Pointe Noire Airport – Pointe-Noire

FD – Eswatini  

 FDHG – Piggs Peak Airfield – Ngonini
 FDKS – Kubuta Airfield – Kubuta

 FDMH – Mhlume Airfield – Mhlume
 FDMS (MTS) – Matsapha Airport – Manzini
 FDNH – Nhlangano Airfield – Nhlangano
 FDNS – Nsoko Airfield – Nsoko
 FDSK (SHO) – King Mswati III Int'l Airport – Manzini
 FDSM – Simunye Airfield – Simunye
 FDST – Siteki Airfield – Siteki
 FDTM – Tambankulu Airfield – Tambankulu
 FDTS – Tshaneni Airfield – Tshaneni
 FDUB – Ubombo Ranches Airfield – Big Bend

FE – Central African Republic 

 FEFA – Alindao Airport – Alindao
 FEFB  – Poste Airport – Obo
 FEFC (CRF) – Carnot Airport – Carnot
 FEFE – Mobaye Mbanga Airport – Mobaye
 FEFF (BGF) – Bangui M'Poko International Airport – Bangui
 FEFG (BGU) – Bangassou Airport – Bangassou
 FEFI (IRO) – Birao Airport – Birao
 FEFL (BEM) – Bossembele Airport – Bossembélé
 FEFM (BBY) – Bambari Airport – Bambari
 FEFN (NDL) – N'Délé Airport – N'Délé
 FEFO (BOP) – Bouar Airport – Bouar
 FEFP – Paoua Airport – Paoua
 FEFR (BIV) – Bria Airport – Bria
 FEFS (BSN) – Bossangoa Airport – Bossangoa
 FEFT (BBT) – Berberati Airport – Berbérati
 FEFU – Sibut Airport – Sibut
 FEFW (ODA) – Ouadda Airport – Ouadda
 FEFY (AIG) – Yalinga Airport – Yalinga
 FEFZ (IMO) – Zemio Airport – Zemio
 FEGC – Bocaranga Airport – Bocaranga
 FEGE (MKI) – M'Boki Airport – Obo
 FEGF (BTG) – Batangafo Airport – Batangafo
 FEGL (GDI) – Gordil Airport – Gordil
 FEGM (BMF) – Bakouma Airport – Bakouma
 FEGO (ODJ) – Ouanda Djallé Airport – Ouanda Djallé
 FEGR (RFA) – Rafai Airport – Rafaï
 FEGU (BCF) – Bouca Airport – Bouca
 FEGZ (BOZ) – Bozoum Airport – Bozoum

FG – Equatorial Guinea 

 FGAB (NBN) – Annobón Airport – San Antonio de Palé
 FGBT (BSG) – Bata Airport – Bata
 FGMY (GEM) – President Obiang Nguema International Airport – Mengomeyén
 FGSL (SSG) – Malabo Airport – Malabo

FH – Saint Helena, Ascension and Tristan da Cunha 
Also see airport category and list.

 FHAW (ASI) – RAF Ascension Island ("Wideawake") (Ascension Aux. AF) – Georgetown
 FHSH (HLE) – Saint Helena Airport – Saint Helena, Ascension and Tristan da Cunha

FI – Mauritius 

 FIMA – Agalega Airstrip – Agalega Islands
 FIMP (MRU) – Sir Seewoosagur Ramgoolam International Airport – Plaine Magnien
 FIMR (RRG) – Sir Gaëtan Duval Airport (Plaine Corail Airport) – Rodrigues Island

FJ – British Indian Ocean Territory 

 FJDG  – Naval Support Facility Diego Garcia – Diego Garcia

FK – Cameroon 

 FKKB (KBI) – Kribi Airport – Kribi
 FKKC (TKC) – Tiko Airport – Tiko
 FKKD (DLA) – Douala International Airport – Douala
 FKKF (MMF) – Mamfe Airport – Mamfe
 FKKG (BLC) – Bali Airport – Bali
 FKKH (KLE) – Kaélé Airport – Kaélé
 FKKI (OUR) – Batouri Airport – Batouri
 FKKJ (GXX) – Yagoua Airport – Yagoua
 FKKL (MVR) – Salak Airport – Maroua
 FKKM (FOM) – Nkounja Airport – Foumban
 FKKN (NGU) – Nguti Airport – Nguti
 FKKN (NGE) – N'Gaoundéré Airport – N'Gaoundéré
 FKKO (BTA) – Bertoua Airport – Bertoua
 FKKR (GOU) – Garoua International Airport – Garoua
 FKKS (DSC) – Dschang Airport – Dschang
 FKKU (BFX) – Bafoussam Airport – Bafoussam
 FKKV (BPC) – Bamenda Airport – Bamenda
 FKKW (EBW) – Ebolowa Airport – Ebolowa
 FKKY (YAO) – Yaoundé Airport – Yaoundé
 FKYS (NSI) – Yaoundé Nsimalen International Airport – Yaoundé

FL – Zambia 

 FLBA (MMQ) – Mbala Airport – Mbala
 FLCP (CIP) – Chipata Airport – Chipata
 FLHN (LVI) – Harry Mwanga Nkumbula International Airport – Livingstone
 FLKE (ZKP) – Kasompe Airport – Chingola
 FLKK (LUN) – Kenneth Kaunda International Airport – Lusaka
 FLKL (KLB) – Kalabo Airport – Kalabo
 FLKO (KMZ) – Kaoma Airport – Kaoma
 FLKS (KAA) – Kasama Airport – Kasama
 FLKW (QKE) – Milliken Airport – Kabwe
 FLLC – Lusaka City Airport – Lusaka
 FLLI (LVI) – Livingstone Airport – former code and name for Harry Mwanga Nkumbula International Airport (FLHN)
 FLLK (LXU) – Lukulu Airport – Lukulu
 FLLS (LUN) – Lusaka International Airport – former code and name for Kenneth Kaunda International Airport (FLKK)
 FLMA (MNS) – Mansa Airport – Mansa
 FLMF (MFU) – Mfuwe Airport – Mfuwe
 FLMG (MNR) – Mongu Airport – Mongu
 FLND (NLA) – Ndola Airport – former code and name for Simon Mwansa Kapwepwe International Airport (FLSK)
 FLSK (NLA) – Simon Mwansa Kapwepwe International Airport – Ndola
 FLSN (SXG) – Senanga Airport – Senanga
 FLSO (KIW) – Southdowns Airport – Kitwe
 FLSS (SJQ) – Sesheke Airport – Sesheke
 FLSW (SLI) – Solwezi Airport – Solwezi
 FLZB (BBZ) – Zambezi Airport – Zambezi

FM – Comoros, Mayotte, Réunion, and Madagascar

Comoros 

 FMCH (HAH) – Prince Said Ibrahim International Airport – Moroni, Comoros
 FMCI (NWA) – Mohéli Bandar Es Eslam Airport – Mohéli, Comoros
 FMCN (YVA) – Iconi Airport – Moroni, Comoros
 FMCV (AJN) – Ouani Airport – Anjouan, Comoros

Mayotte 

 FMCZ (DZA) – Dzaoudzi Pamandzi International Airport – Dzaoudzi, Mayotte

Réunion 

 FMEE (RUN) – Roland Garros Airport – Saint-Denis, Réunion
 FMEP (ZSE) – Pierrefonds Airport – Saint-Pierre, Réunion

Madagascar 

 FMMA – Arivonimamo Air Base – Antananarivo, Madagascar
 FMMC (WML) – Malaimbandy Airport – Malaimbandy, Madagascar
 FMME (ATJ) – Antsirabe Airport – Antsirabe, Madagascar
 FMMG (WAQ) – Antsalova Airport – Antsalova, Madagascar
 FMMI (TNR) – Ivato International Airport – Antanànarìvo, Madagascar
 FMMK (JVA) – Ankavandra Airport – Ankavandra, Madagascar
 FMML (BMD) – Belo sur Tsiribihina Airport – Belo sur Tsiribihina, Madagascar
 FMMN (ZVA) – Miandrivazo Airport – Miandrivazo, Madagascar
 FMMO (MXT) – Maintirano Airport – Maintirano, Madagascar
 FMMQ (ILK) – Ilaka-Est Airport – Ilaka-Est, Madagascar
 FMMR (TVA) – Morafenobe Airport – Morafenobe, Madagascar
 FMMS (SMS) – Sainte Marie Airport – Île Sainte-Marie, Madagascar
 FMMT (TMM) – Toamasina Airport – Toamasina, Madagascar
 FMMU (WTA) – Tambohorano Airport – Tambohorano, Madagascar
 FMMV (MOQ) – Morondava Airport – Morondava, Madagascar
 FMMX (WTS) – Tsiroanomandidy Airport – Tsiroanomandidy, Madagascar
 FMMY (VAT) – Vatomandry Airport – Vatomandry, Madagascar
 FMMZ (WAM) – Ambatondrazaka Airport – Ambatondrazaka, Madagascar
 FMNA (DIE) – Arrachart Airport – Antsiranana, Madagascar
 FMNC (WMR) – Mananara Nord Airport – Mananara Nord, Madagascar
 FMND (ZWA) – Andapa Airport – Andapa, Madagascar
 FMNF (WBD) – Befandriana Nord Airport – Befandriana Nord, Madagascar
 FMNG (WPB) – Port Berge Airport – Port Berge, Madagascar
 FMNH (ANM) – Antsirabato Airport – Antalaha, Madagascar
 FMNJ (IVA) – Ambanja Airport – Ambanja, Madagascar
 FMNL (HVA) – Analalava Airport – Analalava, Madagascar
 FMNM (MJN) – Amborovy Airport – Mahajanga, Madagascar
 FMNN (NOS) – Fascene Airport – Nosy Be, Madagascar
 FMNO (DWB) – Soalala Airport – Soalala, Madagascar
 FMNQ (BPY) – Besalampy Airport – Besalampy, Madagascar
 FMNR (WMN) – Maroantsetra Airport – Maroantsetra, Madagascar
 FMNS (SVB) – Sambava Sud Airport – Sambava Sud, Madagascar
 FMNT (TTS) – Tsaratanana Airport – Tsaratanana, Madagascar
 FMNV (VOH) – Vohemar Airport – Vohemar, Madagascar
 FMNW (WAI) – Ambalabe Airport – Antsohihy, Madagascar
 FMNZ – Ampampamena Airport – Ampampamena, Madagascar
 FMSB (WBO) – Antsoa Airport – Beroroha, Madagascar
 FMSC (WMD) – Mandabe Airport – Mandabe, Madagascar
 FMSD (FTU) – Tôlanaro Airport – Tôlanaro, Madagascar
 FMSF (WFI) – Fianarantsoa Airport – Fianarantsoa, Madagascar
 FMSI (IHO) – Ihosy Airport – Ihosy, Madagascar
 FMSJ (MJA) – Manja Airport – Manja, Madagascar
 FMSK (WVK) – Manakara Airport – Manakara, Madagascar
 FMSL (OVA) – Bekily Airport – Bekily, Madagascar
 FMSM (MNJ) – Mananjary Airport – Mananjary, Madagascar
 FMSN (TDV) – Tanandava-Samangoky Airport – Tanandava-Samangoky, Madagascar
 FMSR (MXM) – Morombe Airport – Morombe, Madagascar
 FMST (TLE) – Toliara Airport – Toliara, Madagascar
 FMSV (BKU) – Betioky Airport – Betioky, Madagascar
 FMSY (AMP) – Ampanihy Airport – Ampanihy, Madagascar
 FMSZ (WAK) – Ankazoabo Airport – Ankazoabo, Madagascar

FN – Angola 

 FNAM (AZZ) – Ambriz Airport – Ambriz
 FNBC (SSY) – Mbanza Congo Airport – Mbanza Congo
 FNBG (BUG) – Benguela Airport – Benguela
 FNCA (CAB) – Cabinda Airport – Cabinda
 FNCF (CFF) – Cafunfo Airport – Cafunfo
 FNCH (PGI) – Chitato Airport – Chitato
 FNCT (CBT) – Catumbela Airport – Catumbela
 FNCV (CTI) – Cuito Cuanavale Airport – Cuito Cuanavale
 FNCX  – Camaxilo Airport – Camaxilo
 FNCZ (CAV) – Cazombo Airport – Cazombo
 FNDU (DUE) – Dundo Airport – Dundo
 FNGI (VPE/NGV) – Ondjiva Pereira Airport – Ondjiva (Ongiva, Ngiva, N'giva)
 FNHU (NOV) – Albano Machado Airport – Huambo
 FNKU (SVP) – Joaquim Kapango Airport – Cuito
 FNLK (LBZ) – Lucapa Airport – Lucapa (Lukapa)
 FNLU (LAD) – Quatro de Fevereiro Airport – Luanda
 FNMA (MEG) – Malanje Airport – Malanje
 FNME (SPP) – Menongue Airport – Menongue
 FNMO (MSZ) – Moçâmedes Airport – Moçâmedes
 FNNG (GXG) – Negage Airport – Negage
 FNPA (PBN) – Porto Amboim Airport – Porto Amboim
 FNSA (VHC) – Saurimo Airport – Saurimo
 FNSO (SZA) – Soyo Airport – Soyo
 FNUA (UAL) – Luau Airport – Luau
 FNUB (SDD) – Lubango Airport – Lubango
 FNUE (LUO) – Luena Airport – Luena
 FNUG (UGO) – Uige Airport – Uíge
 FNWK (CEO) – Waco Kungo Airport – Waco Kungo
 FNXA (XGN) – Xangongo Airport – Xangongo
 FNZE (ARZ) – N'zeto Airport – N'zeto
 FNZG (NZA) – Nzagi Airport – Nzagi (Andrada)

FO – Gabon 

 FOGA (AKE) – Akieni Airport – Akieni
 FOGB (BGB) – Booué Airport – Booué
 FOGE (KDN) – Ndendé Airport – Ndendé
 FOGF (FOU) – Fougamou Airport – Fougamou
 FOGG (MBC) – Mbigou Airport – Mbigou
 FOGI (MGX) – Moabi Airport – Moabi
 FOGK (KOU) – Mabimbi Airport – Koulamoutou
 FOGM (MJL) – Mouila (City) Airport – Mouila
 FOGO (OYE) – Oyem Airport – Oyem
 FOGQ (OKN) – Okondja Airport – Okondja
 FOGR (LBQ) – Lambaréné Airport – Lambaréné
 FOOB (BMM) – Bitam Airport – Bitam
 FOOD (MFF) – Moanda Airport – Moanda
 FOOE (MKB) – Mékambo Airport – Mékambo
 FOOG (POG) – Port-Gentil Airport – Port-Gentil
 FOOH (OMB) – Omboué Hospital Airport – Omboué
 FOOI (IGE) – Tchongorove Airport – Iguela
 FOOK (MKU) – Makokou Airport – Makokou
 FOOL (LBV) – Leon M'Ba International Airport – Libreville
 FOOM (MZC) – Mitzic Airport – Mitzic
 FOON (MVB) – M'vengue Airport – Franceville
 FOOR (LTL) – Lastourville Airport – Lastourville
 FOOS (ZKM) – Setté Cama Airport – Setté Cama
 FOOT (TCH) – Tchibanga Airport – Tchibanga
 FOOY (MYB) – Mayumba Airport – Mayumba

FP – São Tomé and Príncipe 

 FPPA (PGP) – Porto Alegre Airport – São Tomé
 FPPR (PCP) – Príncipe Airport – Príncipe
 FPST (TMS) – São Tomé International Airport (Salazar Airport) – São Tomé

FQ – Mozambique 

 FQAG (ANO) – Angoche Airport – Angoche
 FQBR (BEW) – Beira Airport – Beira
 FQCB (FXO) – Cuamba Airport – Cuamba
 FQCH (VPY) – Chimoio Airport – Chimoio
 FQIN (INH) – Inhambane Airport – Inhambane
 FQLC (VXC) – Lichinga Airport – Lichinga
 FQLU (LFB) – Lumbo Airport – Lumbo
 FQMA (MPM) – Maputo International Airport – Maputo
 FQMD (MUD) – Mueda Airport – Mueda
 FQMP (MZB) – Mocímboa da Praia Airport – Mocímboa da Praia
 FQNC (MNC) – Nacala Airport – Nacala
 FQNP (APL) – Nampula Airport – Nampula
 FQPB (POL) – Pemba Airport – Pemba
 FQQL (UEL) – Quelimane Airport – Quelimane
 FQSG – Songo Airport – Songo
 FQTT (TET) – Chingozi Airport – Tete
 FQUG – Ulongwe Airport – Ulongwe
 FQVL (VNX) – Vilankulo Airport – Vilankulo
 FQXA (VJB) – Xai-Xai Chongoene Airport – Xai-Xai

FS – Seychelles 

 FSAL – Alphonse Airport – Alphonse Island
 FSAS – Assumption Island Airport – Assumption Island
 FSDA – D'Arros Airport – D'Arros Island
 FSDR (DES) – Desroches Airport – Desroches Island (Île Desroches)
 FSFA – Farquhar Airport – Farquhar Islands
 FSIA (SEZ) – Seychelles International Airport – Mahé Island
 FSMA – Marie Louise Airport – Marie Louise Island
 FSPL – Platte Airport – Platte Island (Île Platte)
 FSPP (PRI) – Praslin Island Airport – Praslin Island
 FSSA – Astove Island Airport – Astove Island
 FSSB (BDI) – Bird Island Airport – Bird Island
 FSSC – Coëtivy Airport – Coëtivy Island
 FSSD (DEI) – Denis Island Airport – Denis Island
 FSSF (FRK) – Frégate Island Airport – Frégate Island
 FSSR – Remire Airport – Remire Island (Eagle Island)

FT – Chad 

 FTTA (SRH) – Sarh Airport – Sarh
 FTTB (OGR) – Bongor Airport – Bongor
 FTTC (AEH) – Abéché Airport – Abéché
 FTTD (MQQ) – Moundou Airport – Moundou
 FTTE – Biltine Airport – Biltine
 FTTF – Fada Airport – Fada
 FTTG – Goz Beïda Airport – Goz Beïda
 FTTH (LTC) – Laï Airport – Laï
 FTTI (ATV) – Ati Airport – Ati
 FTTJ (NDJ) – N'Djamena International Airport – N'Djamena
 FTTK (BKR) – Bokoro Airport – Bokoro
 FTTL (OTC) – Bol Airport – Bol
 FTTM (MVO) – Mongo Airport – Mongo
 FTTN (AMC) – Am-Timan Airport – Am-Timan
 FTTP (PLF) – Pala Airport – Pala
 FTTR – Zouar Airport – Zouar
 FTTS (OUT) – Bousso Airport – Bousso
 FTTU (AMO) – Mao Airport – Mao
 FTTY (FYT) – Faya-Largeau Airport – Faya-Largeau
 FTTZ – Zougra Airport – Bardaï

FV – Zimbabwe 

 FVBU (BUQ) – Joshua Mqabuko Nkomo International Airport – Bulawayo
 FVCH (CHJ) – Chipinge Airport – Chipinge
 FVCP       – Charles Prince Airport – Harare
 FVCZ (BFO) – Buffalo Range Airport – Chiredzi
 FVFA (VFA) – Victoria Falls Airport – Victoria Falls
 FVGR       – Grand Reef Airport – Mutare
 FVHA (HRE) – Robert Gabriel Mugabe International Airport – Harare (ICAO code designated: FVRG)
 FVKB (KAB) – Kariba Airport – Kariba
 FVMT       – Mutoko Airport – Mutoko
 FVMU (UTA) – Mutare Airport – Mutare
 FVMV (MVZ) – Masvingo Airport – Masvingo
 FVOT       – Kotwa Airport, Kotwa
 FVSH       – Zvishavane Airport – Zvishavane
 FVTL (GWE) – Gweru-Thornhill Air Base – Gweru
 FVWN (HWN) – Hwange National Park Airport – Hwange (Hwange National Park)
 FVWT (WKI) – Hwange Town Airport – Hwange Town

FW – Malawi 

 FWCD (CEH) – Chelinda Airport – Chelinda
 FWCL (BLZ) – Chileka International Airport – Blantyre
 FWCM (CMK) – Club Makokola Airport – Club Makokola
 FWCS – Ntchisi Airport – Ntchisi
 FWCT – Chitipa Airport – Chitipa
 FWDW (DWA) – Dwanga Airport – Dwanga
 FWKA (KGJ) – Karonga Airport – Karonga
 FWKB – Katumbi Airport – Katumbi
 FWKG (KBQ) – Kasungu Airport – Kasungu
 FWKI (LLW) – Lilongwe International Airport (Kamuzu Int'l) – Lilongwe
 FWKK - Nkhotakhota/Tangole Airport
 FWLK (LIX) – Likoma Airport – Likoma
 FWLP – Lifupa Airport – Kasungu
 FWMC – Mchinji Airport – Mchinji
 FWMG (MAI) – Mangochi Airport – Mangochi
 FWMY (MYZ) – Monkey Bay Airport – Monkey Bay
 FWSJ – Nsanje Airport – Nsanje
 FWSM (LMB) – Salima Airport – Salima
 FWSU – Sucoma Airport – Nchalo
 FWUU (ZZU) – Mzuzu Airport – Mzuzu
 FWZA – Zomba Airport – Zomba

FX – Lesotho 

 FXLK (LEF) – Lebakeng Airport – Lebakeng
 FXLR (LRB) – Leribe Airport – Leribe
 FXLS (LES) – Lesobeng Airport – Lesobeng
 FXMA (MSG) – Matsaile Airport – Matsaile
 FXMF (MFC) – Mafeteng Airport – Mafeteng
 FXMK (MKH) – Mokhotlong Airport – Mokhotlong
 FXMM (MSU) – Moshoeshoe International Airport – Maseru
 FXMU – Mejametalana Airport – Maseru
 FXNK (NKU) – Nkaus Airport – Nkaus
 FXPG (PEL) – Pelaneng Airport – Pelaneng
 FXQG (UTG) – Quthing Airport – Quthing
 FXQN (UNE) – Qacha's Nek Airport – Qacha's Nek
 FXSK (SKQ) – Sekake Airport – Sekake
 FXSM (SOK) – Semonkong Airport – Semonkong
 FXTA (THB) – Thaba Tseka Airport – Thaba Tseka
 FXTK (TKO) – Tlokoeng Airport – Tlokoeng

FY – Namibia 

 FYAR (ADI) – Arandis Airport – Arandis
 FYEN – Eenhana Airport – Eenhana
 FYGF (GFY) – Grootfontein Air Force Base – Grootfontein
 FYHH – Helmeringhausen Airstrip – Helmeringhausen
 FYHI (HAL) – Halali Airport – Halali
 FYKB (KAS) – Karasburg Airport – Karasburg
 FYKM (MPA) – Katima Mulilo Airport (formerly FYMP) – Katima Mulilo
 FYKT (KMP) – Keetmanshoop Airport – Keetmanshoop
 FYLZ (LUD) – Lüderitz Airport – Lüderitz
 FYMO (OKU) – Mokuti Lodge Airport – Mokuti Lodge
 FYNA (NNI) – Namutoni Airport – Namutoni
 FYNP – Nepara Airfield – Nkurenkuru
 FYOA (OND) – Andimba Toivo ya Toivo Airport – Ondangwa
 FYOE (OMG) – Omega Airport – Omega
 FYOG (OMD) – Oranjemund Airport – Oranjemund
 FYOH – Okahao Airport – Okahao
 FYOO (OKF) – Okaukuejo Airport – Okaukuejo
 FYOP (OPW) – Opuwa Airport – Opuwa
 FYOS (OHI) – Oshakati Airport – Oshakati
 FYRU (NDU) – Rundu Airport – Rundu
 FYSM (SWP) – Swakopmund Airport – Swakopmund
 FYTM (TSB) – Tsumeb Airport – Tsumeb
 FYWB (WVB) – Walvis Bay Airport – Walvis Bay
 FYWE (ERS) – Eros Airport – Windhoek
 FYWH (WDH) – Hosea Kutako International Airport – Windhoek

FZ – Democratic Republic of the Congo 

 FZAA (FIH) – N'Djili International Airport – Kinshasa
 FZAB (NLO) – N'Dolo Airport – Kinshasa
 FZAG (MNB) – Muanda Airport – Moanda
 FZAJ (BOA) – Boma Airport – Boma
 FZAL (LZI) – Luozi Airport – Luozi
 FZAM (MAT) – Tshimpi Airport – Matadi
 FZAR (NKL) – Nkolo-Fuma Airport – Kolo Fuma
 FZBA (INO) – Inongo Airport – Inongo
 FZBI (NIO) – Nioki Airport – Nioki
 FZBO (FDU) – Bandundu Airport – Bandundu
 FZBT (KRZ) – Kiri Airport – Kiri
 FZCA (KKW) – Kikwit Airport – Kikwit
 FZCB (IDF) – Idiofa Airport – Idiofa
 FZCE (LUS) – Lusanga Airport – Lusanga
 FZCV (MSM) – Masi-Manimba Airport – Masi-Manimba
 FZEA (MDK) – Mbandaka Airport – Mbandaka
 FZEN (BSU) – Basankusu Airport – Basankusu
 FZFA (LIE) – Libenge Airport – Libenge
 FZFD (BDT) – Gbadolite Airport – Gbadolite
 FZFK (GMA) – Gemena Airport – Gemena
 FZFU (BMB) – Bumba Airport – Bumba
 FZGA (LIQ) – Lisala Airport – Lisala
 FZGN (BNB) – Boende Airport – Boende
 FZGV (IKL) – Ikela Airport – Ikela
 FZIC (FKI) – Bangoka International Airport – Kisangani
 FZIR (YAN) – Yangambi Airport – Yangambi
 FZJH (IRP) – Matari Airport – Isiro
 FZKA (BUX) – Bunia Airport – Bunia
 FZKJ (BZU) – Buta Zega Airport – Buta Zega
 FZMA (BKY) – Kavumu Airport – Bukavu
 FZNA (GOM) – Goma International Airport – Goma
 FZNP (BNC) – Beni Airport – Beni
 FZOA (KND) – Kindu Airport – Kindu
 FZOD (KLY) – Kinkungwa Airport – Kalima
 FZOP (PUN) – Punia Airport – Punia
 FZQA (FBM) – Lubumbashi International Airport – Lubumbashi
 FZQC (PWO) – Pweto Airport – Pweto
 FZQG (KEC) – Kasenga Airport – Kasenga
 FZQM (KWZ) – Kolwezi Airport – Kolwezi
 FZRA (MNO) – Manono Airport – Manono
 FZRB (BDV) – Moba Airport – Moba
 FZRF (FMI) – Kalemie Airport – Kalemie
 FZRM (KBO) – Kabalo Airport – Kabalo
 FZRQ (KOO) – Kongolo Airport – Kongolo
 FZSA (KMN) – Kamina Air Base – Kamina
 FZSB – Kamina Airport – Kamina
 FZSK (KAP) – Kapanga Airport – Kapanga
 FZTK (KNM) – Kaniama Airport – Kaniama
 FZUA (KGA) – Kananga Airport – Kananga
 FZUF (KGN) – Kasonga Airport – Kasonga
 FZUG (LZA) – Luiza Airport – Luiza
 FZUH (MMW) – Moma Airport – Moma
 FZUK (TSH) – Tshikapa Airport – Tshikapa
 FZVA (LJA) – Lodja Airport – Lodja
 FZVI (LBO) – Lusambo Airport – Lusambo
 FZVM (MEW) – Mweka Airport – Mweka
 FZVR (BAN) – Basongo Airport – Basongo
 FZWA (MJM) – Mbuji Mayi Airport – Mbuji Mayi
 FZWC (GDJ) – Gandajika Airport – Gandajika

References 

 
  – includes IATA codes
 Aviation Safety Network – IATA and ICAO airport codes

F
Airports by ICAO code
Airports by ICAO code
Airports by ICAO code
Airports by ICAO code
Airports by ICAO code
Airports by ICAO code
Airports by ICAO code
Airports by ICAO code
Airports by ICAO code
Airports by ICAO code
Airports by ICAO code
Airports by ICAO code
Airports by ICAO code
Airports by ICAO code
Airports by ICAO code
Airports by ICAO code
Airports by ICAO code
Airports by ICAO code
Airports by ICAO code
Airports by ICAO code
Airports by ICAO code
Airports by ICAO code
Airports by ICAO code